Foumban Nkounja Airport  is an airport serving Foumban, a city in the Noun Department of the West Province in Cameroon. It is also known as Foumban Airport.
The airport is located southwest of Foumban in Koutaba,. Some sources also wrongly refer to it as the Koutaba Airport .

References

Airports in Cameroon